QVL may stand for:

 Quella Vecchia Locanda, an Italian band
 Qatari Volleyball League
 Cajatambo North Lima Quechua language (ISO 639: qvl)